The Strange Case of Peter the Lett is a 1931 detective novel by the Belgian writer Georges Simenon. It is the first novel to feature Inspector Jules Maigret who would later appear in more than a hundred stories by Simenon and who has become a legendary figure in the annals of detective fiction.

Plot summary
Maigret is notified through Interpol that Peter the Lett, an international fraudster and leader of the notorious Baltic Gang, is travelling to Paris. Furnished only with a description he and a squad from the Police Judiciaire plan to intercept him at the Gare du Nord. However, after seeing a man who matches the description Maigret is called to a carriage of the train to find a body, also matching the description he has.

Tracking the first man to a hotel he is identified as Oswald Oppenheim, a businessman in town to meet an American, Mortimer Levington and his wife.

Meanwhile, forensic examination of the body leads Maigret to the sea-side town of Fécamp, and to the family of Norwegian sea-captain, Olaf Swaan, another man who matches Peter's description. While staking out the house, he follows another, identical, man, an itinerant Russian, later named as Fyodor Yurevich. Maigret follows him back to Paris, to a flop-house in the Marais district where he is found to live with a prostitute, Anna Gorskin.

So who is Peter? A vagrant, a seaman, a businessman, a corpse? Is he Russian, Norwegian, American or Latvian? Maigret's persistence is needed to unravel the mystery and track down the real Peter.

Maigret's method
In this story, we are introduced to aspects of M's detective method. Simenon tells us that, like any other policeman, Maigret “worked with the amazing tools that men like Bertillon, Reiss and Locard have given the police;  anthropometry, the principle of the trace and so on”. But that beyond that he sought “the crack in the wall” where the tiniest flaw in a man's camouflage is allowed to slip, giving Maigret a firm grasp on his real nature (p 38).
Later Simenon describes the moment when Peter's character “cracked wide open”; having observed that Peter was not merely playing a role, but “living quite different lives in alternation”, Maigret caught, in a bar-room mirror “a quiver in Pietr's lips, and an almost imperceptible contraction of his nostrils”. At that moment Maigret saw “now the guest of the Majestic, now Anna Gorskin's tormented lover” (p94-96).

Maigret's description
Simenon recalled when asked about the conception of his character, that he was sitting on his boat and imagined "a large, powerfully built gentleman I thought would make a passable inspector. As the day wore on I added other features; a pipe, a bowler hat, a thick overcoat with a velvet collar, and, as it was cold and damp, I put a cast-iron stove in his office".

Other titles
The book has been translated three times into English: In 1933, by Anthony Abbott as The Strange Case of Peter the Lett; in 1963 by Daphne Woodward as Maigret and the Enigmatic Lett; and in 2013 by David Bellos as Pietr the Latvian.

Adaptations
The story has been adapted for television three times: In English in 1963 (with Rupert Davies in the main role); in Dutch in 1967 (Jan Teulings); and in French in 1972 (Jean Richard).

See also

[[Le Monde's 100 Books of the Century|Le Monde'''s 100 Books of the Century]]

Notes

References
 Georges Simenon Pietr the Latvian'' 1931; translated D Bellos 2013 Penguin Classics, London

External links
 Maigret at trussel.com

1931 Belgian novels
Maigret novels
Novels set in France
Novels set in the 20th century